Robert T. Elson (1891–1975) was an American writer, editor, and executive for Time Inc.

Background
Elson came from Lakewood, Ohio.

Career
Elson worked for two decades as a Canadian newspaper reporter.

In 1943, he joined Time, Inc., and held a variety of editorial and executive positions at Time, Fortune and Life magazines.

In 1968, he published a corporate-approved history called Time Inc.: The Intimate History of a Publishing Enterprise , edited by Duncan Norton-Taylor.

He retired in 1969.

Personal and death
Elson had two sons and three daughter, including Time writer John T. Elson.

He died age 80 of complications following a stroke on March 11, 1987, at Southampton Hospital on Long Island.

Works
Time Inc.: The Intimate History of a Publishing Enterprise (1968)
Prelude to War (1976)

See also
Henry R. Luce
Time-Life

References

1891 births
1975 deaths
American magazine publishers (people)
People from Lakewood, Ohio
Time (magazine) people
American writers
American editors